Mel Ziegler and his wife Patricia Ziegler were the American founders of Banana Republic.

Along with William Rosenzweig, they also co-founded The Republic of Tea. They eventually sold both companies.

The Zieglers subsequently founded another apparel company, Zoza, but this was shut down in the dot com crash of 2000.

Their eldest son, Zio Ziegler, is a notable large-scale metal sculptor, painter, and street artist. Their daughter, Aza, is a Los Angeles-based fashion designer and stylist. Her fashion line is Calle Del Mar.  The couple published a 2012 memoir titled Wild Company, The Untold Story of Banana Republic, recounting their quirky adventures founding Banana Republic. They are also authors of The Republic of Tea, which details their unconventional founding of that company as well.

References

Bibliography
 Later re-published as: 

American fashion businesspeople
Living people
Year of birth missing (living people)